Kurowice may refer to the following places in Poland:
Kurowice, Lower Silesian Voivodeship (south-west Poland)
Kurowice, Łódź Voivodeship (central Poland)
Kurowice, Masovian Voivodeship (east-central Poland)